Old Cochecton Cemetery is a historic cemetery located at Cochecton in Sullivan County, New York.  It was established about 1774 and believed to contain about 150 burials.  The earliest extant markers date to 1798 and 1809.

It was added to the National Register of Historic Places in 1992.

References

External links
 

Cemeteries on the National Register of Historic Places in New York (state)
1774 establishments in the Province of New York
Cemeteries in Sullivan County, New York
National Register of Historic Places in Sullivan County, New York